Samuil Abramovich Samosud (Tbilisi, Georgia,  — Moscow, 6 November 1964), PAU, was a Soviet and Russian conductor.

He started his musical career as a cellist, before becoming a conductor at the Mariinsky Theater, Petrograd in 1917.  From 1918 to 1936 he conducted at the Maly Operny, Leningrad.  In 1936 he became musical director at the Bolshoi Theater, Moscow.  He founded what became the Moscow Philharmonic Orchestra in 1951.  He premiered several important works, including Shostakovich's Lady Macbeth of the Mtsensk District, The Nose and the Seventh Symphony; as well as Prokofiev's War and Peace and On Guard for Peace.  Shostakovich "had a high opinion" of Samosud's theatrical performances, and regarded him as "the supreme interpreter" of operatic works including Lady Macbeth.  Nonetheless, after hearing Samosud conduct the Seventh Symphony, the composer wrote that he wanted to hear Yevgeny Mravinsky perform the symphony, as he didn't "have great faith in Samosud as a symphonic conductor".

References

External links 
 Samuel Samosud — Biography on Prokofiev.org (on Internet Archive, captured on 4 February 2012)

1884 births
1964 deaths
Soviet conductors (music)
20th-century Russian conductors (music)
Russian male conductors (music)
20th-century Russian male musicians
Russian Jews
Musicians from Tbilisi
Burials at Novodevichy Cemetery